The Concert is a 1988 historical novel by Ismail Kadare. Titled originally Koncert në fund të dimrit in Albanian, the novel treats the events leading to the break in Albanian-Chinese diplomatic relations in the period 1972–78.

References

1988 novels
20th-century Albanian novels
Novels by Ismail Kadare